Johannes Wouter "Joop" Boutmy (29 April 1894, in Georgetown, Penang, Straits Settlements – 26 July 1972, in Verona, United States) was a Dutch amateur football player who competed in the 1912 Summer Olympics.

Club career
He played 89 matches for HBS from The Hague, scoring 6 goals between 1910 and 1922.

International career
Boutmy made his debut for the Netherlands in a June 1912 Summer Olympics match against Austria and earned a total of 10 caps, scoring 1 goal. His final international was a May 1914 friendly match against Denmark. He won the bronze medal with the Dutch at the 1912 Summer Olympics football tournament.

Personal life
Boutmy moved to the Dutch East Indies and later to the United States, where he died in 1972.

References

External links
 
 

1894 births
1972 deaths
People from Penang
Dutch emigrants to the United States
Association football midfielders
Dutch footballers
Netherlands international footballers
Footballers at the 1912 Summer Olympics
Olympic footballers of the Netherlands
Olympic bronze medalists for the Netherlands
Olympic medalists in football
HBS Craeyenhout players
Medalists at the 1912 Summer Olympics
Dutch expatriates in British Malaya